A cricket team representing the Sussex Cricket Board played eight List A cricket matches between 1999 and 2002. This is a list of the players who appeared in those matches.

Steven Ades, 5 matches, 2000–2001
Danny Alderman, 6 matches, 1999–2001
George Campbell, 7 matches, 2000–2002
Brian Chambers, 1 match, 1999 
Dominic Clapp, 2 matches, 2000 
Andrew Cornford, 3 matches, 2001–2002
Ian Cox, 1 match, 1999 
Nicholas Creed, 3 matches, 2000–2002
Jason Finch, 3 matches, 2001–2002
Richard Halsall, 5 matches, 2000–2001
Michael Harrison, 1 match, 2002 
Marc Hazelton, 1 match, 2001 
Andrew Hodd, 1 match, 2002 
Carl Hopkinson, 2 matches, 2001 
David Hussey, 3 matches, 2001 
Kashif Ibrahim, 2 matches, 2000 
Richard Jackson, 4 matches, 2001 
Shane Jurgensen, 1 match, 1999 
Chris Mole, 5 matches, 1999–2002
John Morgan, 7 matches, 2000–2002
Jonathan Newell, 1 match, 1999 
Mark Newell, 1 match, 1999 
Andrew Perry, 1 match, 2002 
Matt Prior, 1 match, 2000 
Stuart Simmonds, 1 match, 1999 
Bradley Smith, 1 match, 1999 
John Snashall, 2 matches, 2001 
Hugo Southwell, 3 matches, 2000–2001
Paul Stevens, 8 matches, 1999–2002
Neil Turk, 1 match, 2002 
Nick  Weekes, 1 match, 2001 
Andrew Winstone, 1 match, 2001 
Michael Yardy, 3 matches, 1999–2000

References

Sussex Cricket Board